William Meluish ( – 28 November 1888) was a New Zealand photographer and businessman from Bath, Somerset.

He died at home at Otago House, Dunedin, aged 65.

References

1820s births
1888 deaths
New Zealand businesspeople
New Zealand photographers
People from Bath, Somerset
English emigrants to New Zealand